The Outback Region is one of seven regions used by the Local Government Association of South Australia to describe the territories used by its regional groupings of local government areas.

Geography
It is by far the largest region, with very nearly 80 percent of the land area of South Australia, but less than one percent of its population, making it simultaneously by far the least populated and the least densely populated of all seven regions. The region encompasses all areas north and west of the more densely populated southeastern part of the state, all the way to its northern border with the Northern Territory (26th parallel south) and to its western border with Western Australia (129th meridian east). It also borders with Queensland in the northeast, and with New South Wales in the east (141st meridian east).

The Outback Region has a population of 12,496 (as of census of 2006, on an area of 834,679.8, which makes for a population density of 0.015 per km². The largest town is the mining town Roxby Downs (pop. 4055). In total, there are some 60 settlements and communities, including aboriginal communities.

Four of the five aboriginal councils of South Australia fall within the boundaries of the Outback Region. They are listed with the Local Government Areas below. Only Gerard (Aboriginal Council) falls within Murray Mallee region, which is southeast of the Outback Region.

Largest towns
The largest towns of the Outback Region, with their 2006 census population figures which account for more than 70 percent of the Outback Region's population:

Local government areas
On the local government level, the Outback Region is composed of seven units, with a wide range in area from 76 to 624,339 km²:

References

Regions of South Australia